Exoletuncus artifex is a species of moth of the family Tortricidae. It is found in Peru.

The wingspan is 20 mm. The ground colour of the forewings is yellowish white with a black pattern consisting of small elements and with a long subterminal blotch.

References

Moths described in 1997
Euliini
Moths of South America
Taxa named by Józef Razowski